Darauli is a Community development block and a town in district of Siwan, in Bihar state of India. It is one out of 13 blocks of Siwan Subdivision. The headquarter of the block is at Darauli town. 

The block is divided into many Gram Panchayats and villages.

Gram Panchayats
Gram panchayats of Darauli block in Siwan Subdivision, Siwan district.

Amarpur
Balahun
Belaon
Chakari
Daraili mathia
Darauli
Don bujurg
Dumrahar bujurg
Harnatar
Karom
Kashila pachhbenia
Krishnapali
Kumti bhitauli
Sarharwa
Sarna
Tiyar

Darauli (town)
Darauli is a village/town in Darauli Gram Panchayat of Darauli block. it is located at south-west from Siwan, the district headquarter. It is 38 Km at distance from Siwan, via Mairwa. The town is situated at the bank of Ghaghra river. 

See also
Siwan Subdivision
Administration in Bihar

References

Community development blocks in Siwan district